"Train" is a song written and performed by British musical group Goldfrapp for their second album Black Cherry (2003). The song was produced by Goldfrapp and received a very positive reception from music critics. It was released as the lead single in the second quarter of 2003 and reached the top thirty in the United Kingdom, where it became Goldfrapp's first top thirty single. The original title of the song was "Wolf Lady", which makes reference to the lyrics in the second verse of the song.  The lyrics of "Train" are based on Alison Goldfrapp's observations while in Los Angeles, California.  She stated that the song describes wealth, drugs, and sex with "a sort of disgust of it and at the same time a sort of need to indulge in these things."

The song is featured in sports video game FIFA Football 2004.

Formats and track listings
These are the formats and track listings of major single releases of "Train".

 CD single #1 (UK)
"Train" – 4:08
"Train" (Village Hall Mix) – 5:28
"Big Black Cloud, Little White Lie" – 3:07
"Train" (Video) – 4:09

 CD single #2 (UK)
"El Train" (T.Raumschmiere Rmx) – 5:52
"Train" (Ewan Pearson 6/8 Vocal) – 7:34
"Train" (Ewan Pearson 4/4 Instrumental) – 5:27

 12" single (UK)
"Train" – 4:08
"El Train" (T.Raumschmiere Rmx) – 5:52
"Train" (Ewan Pearson 4/4 Instrumental) – 5:27

 Digital single
"Train" – 4:11
"Train" (Village Hall Mix) – 5:28
"Big Black Cloud, Little White Lie" – 3:07
"El Train" (T.Raumschmiere RMX) – 5:52
"Train" (Ewan Pearson 6/8 Vocal) – 7:32
"Train" (Ewan Pearson 4/4 Instrumental) – 7:10
"Train" (Ewan Pearson 4/4 Vocal) – 7:10

Charts

Notes

References 

  

2003 singles
2003 songs
Goldfrapp songs
Mute Records singles
Songs about drugs
Songs about trains
Songs written by Alison Goldfrapp
Songs written by Will Gregory